The Putative Lactococcus lactis Holin (LLHol) Family (TC# 1.E.44) consists of just a few proteins from Lactococcus lactis species and their phage. These proteins are small, between 61 and 78  amino acyl residues (aas) in length, and exhibit one or two transmembrane segments (TMSs). As of March 2016, LLHol proteins remain functionally uncharacterized. They are not demonstrably homologous to members of other holin families and thus do not belong to one of the seven holin superfamilies. A representative list of proteins belonging to the LLHol family can be found in the Transporter Classification Database.

See also 
 Holin
 Lysin
 Transporter Classification Database

Further reading 
 Reddy, Bhaskara L.; Saier Jr., Milton H. (2013-11-01). "Topological and phylogenetic analyses of bacterial holin families and superfamilies". Biochimica et Biophysica Acta (BBA) - Biomembranes 1828 (11): 2654–2671. . . .
 Saier, Milton H.; Reddy, Bhaskara L. (2015-01-01). "Holins in Bacteria, Eukaryotes, and Archaea: Multifunctional Xenologues with Potential Biotechnological and Biomedical Applications". Journal of Bacteriology 197(1): 7–17. . . . .
 Wang, I. N.; Smith, D. L.; Young, R. (2000-01-01). "Holins: the protein clocks of bacteriophage infections". Annual Review of Microbiology 54: 799–825.. . .
 Young, R.; Bläsi, U. (1995-08-01). "Holins: form and function in bacteriophage lysis". FEMS Microbiology Reviews 17 (1-2): 191–205. . .

References 

Protein families
Membrane proteins
Transmembrane proteins
Transmembrane transporters
Transport proteins
Integral membrane proteins
Holins